Direcção Nacional de Estatística (Portuguese for National Directorate of Statistics) or DNE is the national bureau for statistics of East Timor. The organization, a state department under the Directorate-General of Analysis and Research of the Ministry of Finance, is responsible for compiling and disseminating data on the people, society, economy and environment of the nation and the national censuses.

References

External links
Official site

East Timor
Demographics of East Timor
Organizations based in East Timor
Government of East Timor